is a prefecture of Japan located in the Chūbu region of Honshu. Toyama Prefecture has a population of 1,044,588 (1 June 2019) and has a geographic area of 4,247.61 km2 (1,640.01 sq mi). Toyama Prefecture borders Ishikawa Prefecture to the west, Gifu Prefecture to the south, Nagano Prefecture to the east, and Niigata Prefecture to the northeast.

Toyama is the capital and largest city of Toyama Prefecture, with other major cities including Takaoka, Imizu, and Nanto. Toyama Prefecture is part of the historic Hokuriku region, and the majority of prefecture's population lives on Toyama Bay, one of the largest bays in Japan. Toyama Prefecture is the leading industrial prefecture on the Japan Sea coast and has the advantage of cheap electricity from abundant hydroelectric resources. Toyama Prefecture contains the only known glaciers in East Asia outside of Russia, first recognized in 2012, and 30% of the prefecture's area is designated as national parks.

History 

Historically, Toyama Prefecture was Etchū Province. Following the abolition of the han system in 1871, Etchū Province was renamed Niikawa Prefecture, but Imizu District was given to Nanao Prefecture. In 1872 Imizu District was returned by the new Ishikawa Prefecture.

In 1876, Niikawa Prefecture was merged into Ishikawa Prefecture but the merger was void in 1881 and the area was re-established as Toyama Prefecture.

The Itai-itai disease occurred in Toyama around 1950.

Geography 
Toyama Prefecture is bordered by Ishikawa Prefecture to the west, Niigata to the northeast, Nagano to the southeast, Gifu to the south and Sea of Japan to the north.

As of April 1, 2012, 30% of the total land area of the prefecture was designated as Natural Parks, namely the Chūbu-Sangaku and Hakusan National Parks; Noto Hantō Quasi-National Park; and six Prefectural Natural Parks.

Municipalities

Due to the mergers in the 2000s, Toyama has the fewest municipalities of any prefecture in Japan with 10 cities, 2 districts, 4 towns, and 1 village (before the mergers took place, the prefecture had 9 cities, 18 towns, and 8 villages).

Mergers

List of governors of Toyama Prefecture (from 1947) 
 Tetsuji Tachi (館 哲二) (19 April 1947 to 15 November 1947) 
 Takekuni Takatsuji (高辻 武邦) (16 November 1947 to 30 September 1956) 
 Minoru Yoshida (吉田 実) (1 October 1956 to 1 December 1969) 
 Kōkichi Nakata (中田 幸吉) (30 December 1969 to 18 September 1980) 
 Yutaka Nakaoki (中沖 豊) (11 November 1980 to 8 November 2004) 
 Takakazu Ishii (石井 隆一) (9 November 2004 to 8 November 2020)
 Hachirō Nitta (新田 八朗) (9 November 2020 to present)

Economy

Agriculture
In 2014 Toyama contributed approximately 2.5% of Japan's rice production and 
makes use of abundant water sources originating from Mount Tate. It also has many fisheries along its Sea of Japan coastline.

Manufacturing
Toyama is famous for its historical pharmaceutical industry which remains a top manufacturing industry in the prefecture in terms of manufacturing shipment value followed by electronic parts and devices (industrial robots, general machinery, etc.), and metal products (aluminum, copper etc.) manufacturing.

Energy

Kurobe Dam generates electricity for the Kansai Electric Power Company. It is located on the Kurobe River in Toyama Prefecture.

Demographics 

Per Japanese census data, the population of Toyama has been relatively stable since 1950.

Transportation

Rail
Tokyo: 2 hr 7 min via Hokuriku Shinkansen

Osaka: 3 hr via Hokuriku Shinkansen and Thunderbird Limited Express

 The Hokuriku Shinkansen line is scheduled to extend to Osaka in the future, and will shorten the Osaka-Toyama trip to approximately 1 hr 40 min.

Expressway
 Tokyo:  5 hr
 Osaka:  4 hr 10 min
 Nagoya: 3 hr 15 min
 Niigata: 2 hr 30 min

Air
 Toyama Airport (TOY)

Domestic
 Tokyo: 1 hr
 Sapporo: 1 hr 20 min
 Fukuoka: 1 hr 30 min

International
 Shanghai:  2 hr 30 min via Shanghai Airlines
 Dalian: 2 hr 30 min via China Southern Airlines
 Seoul: 1 hr 50 min via Asiana Airlines
 Vladivostok: 2 hr 40 min via Vladivostok Airlines

Culture

UNESCO World Heritage Cultural Sites
Gokayama Historical Village (Nanto City)

National Treasures of Japan
Zuiryū-ji Temple (Takaoka City)

Festivals

Spring

All Japan Chindon Competition (Toyama City (Toyama Castle Park), Mid April
Tonami Tulip Fair (Tonami City), May
Marumage Festival (Himi City), May 17

Summer
Sassa Narimasa Sengoku Era Festival (Toyama City), Late July
Japan Wildlife Film Festival (Toyama Prefecture), Early August

Fall
Toyama Festival (Toyama City), Sept. 1
Owara Kaze no Bon (Toyama City (Yatsuo Area)), Sept. 1-3

Winter
Nanto Toga Soba Festival (Nanto City (Toga Village Area)), Mid Feb.

Regional Foods
Trout Sushi (Masuzushi)
White Shrimp (Shiro Ebi)
Matured Yellow Tail (Buri)
Firefly Squid (Hotaru Ika)
Fish Paste (Kamaboko)

Regional sake
Tateyama (立山)
Narimasa (成政)
Masuizumi (満寿泉)
Sanshoraku (三笑楽）

Sports 

The sports teams listed below are based in Toyama.

Football
Kataller Toyama  (Toyama City)

Basketball
Toyama Grouses  (Toyama City)

Baseball
Toyama Thunderbirds  (Toyama City)

Rugby Union
Takaoka Mariners  (Takaoka)

Tourism 
Tateyama Kurobe Alpine Route
kurobe Gorge Railway
Unazuki Onsen
Gokayama（UNESCO World Heritage Site）
Mitsui Outlet Park, Hokuriku Oyabe

International Links 
 , Liaoning Province - May 9, 1984
 , São Paulo State - July 18, 1985
 , Oregon State- October 19, 1991
 , Primorsky Region - August 26, 1992
 , Basel-Stadt - October 26, 2009
 , Andhra Pradesh State - December 29, 2015

Notes

References
 Nussbaum, Louis-Frédéric and Käthe Roth. (2005).  Japan encyclopedia. Cambridge: Harvard University Press. ; OCLC 58053128
 Prefecture, N. (2022). Toyama Prefecture- The East Asia Local and Regional Government Congress. Retrieved 1 July 2022, from https://www3.pref.nara.jp/eastasia_e/1080.html 
 McClean, C. (2022). 10 Fun Facts About Toyama Prefecture, Japan - Multicultural Kid Blogs. Retrieved 1 July 2022, from https://multiculturalkidblogs.com/2021/11/15/toyama-prefecture/

External links 

 Official Toyama Prefecture Homepage 
 Toyama Prefecture International Center 
 National Archives of Japan Toyama Map (1891)

 
Chūbu region
Prefectures of Japan
Hokuriku region